Dixon Building may refer to:

Dixon Building (Natchez, Mississippi), listed on the National Register of Historic Places in Adams County, Mississippi
The Dixon Building (number 49), part of the Dixon and Griffiths Buildings in Toronto, Canada
Dixon Hall Apartments, listed on the National Register of Historic Places in Cleveland, Ohio
Dixon-Duncan Block in Missoula, Montana, listed on the National Register of Historic Places in Missoula County, Montana
Dixon Mills, a residential building complex in Jersey City, New Jersey